Robert Bruce "Buck" Jones (August 30, 1904 – December 18, 1974) was an American football guard for six seasons for the Green Bay Packers, Newark Tornadoes, and Brooklyn Dodgers of the National Football League (NFL).

References

1904 births
1974 deaths
American football offensive guards
Alabama Crimson Tide football players
Brooklyn Dodgers (NFL) players
Green Bay Packers players
Newark Tornadoes players